The Malvern Rosenwald School is a historic school building at 836 Acme Street (between it and Burks Street) in Malvern, Arkansas.  It is a T-shaped single-story brick building, with a gable roof over its original main section.  A gable-roofed entry is centered on the eastern facade.  Additions extend the original block to the left of the entrance, the last one with a flat roof.  The school was built in 1929 with funding assistance from the Rosenwald Fund, but did not follow a standard Rosenwald plan.  It first served African-American students in grades 1–9, but was gradually expanded to include high school students.  The high school students were reassigned to a new school in 1952, after which it became the Tuggle Elementary School.  Both schools were closed around the time that Malvern's schools were integrated, in 1970.

The building was listed on the National Register of Historic Places in 2005.

See also
National Register of Historic Places listings in Hot Spring County, Arkansas

References

School buildings on the National Register of Historic Places in Arkansas
School buildings completed in 1929
Buildings and structures in Malvern, Arkansas
National Register of Historic Places in Hot Spring County, Arkansas
Rosenwald schools in Arkansas
Historically segregated African-American schools in Arkansas
1929 establishments in Arkansas
Schools in Hot Spring County, Arkansas
Bungalow architecture in Arkansas
American Craftsman architecture in Arkansas
Modern Movement architecture in the United States